Rashid Mabkhout (Arabic:راشد مبخوت) (born 4 May 1998) is a Qatari footballer who plays as a midfielder .

Career
Rashid Mabkhout started his career at Al-Sailiya and is a product of the Al-Sailiya's youth system. On 4 August 2018, Rashid Mabkhout made his professional debut for Al-Sailiya against Umm Salal in the Pro League .

External links

References

Living people
1998 births
Qatari footballers
Al-Sailiya SC players
Qatar Stars League players
Association football midfielders
Place of birth missing (living people)